Neoclassical architecture in Poland was centered on Warsaw under the reign of Stanisław August Poniatowski, while the modern concept of a single capital city was to some extent inapplicable in the decentralized Polish–Lithuanian Commonwealth. Classicism came to Poland in the 18th century as the result of French infiltrations into the Polish millieu. The best-known architects and artists who worked in Poland were Dominik Merlini, Jan Chrystian Kamsetzer, Szymon Bogumił Zug, Stanisław Zawadzki, Efraim Szreger, Antonio Corazzi, Jakub Kubicki, Hilary Szpilowski, Christian Piotr Aigner, Wawrzyniec Gucewicz, Bonifacy Witkowski and Danish Bertel Thorvaldsen.

The first stage, called the Stanislavian style, followed by an almost complete inhibition and a period known as the Congress Kingdom classicism. The palladian patterns were independently interpreted by Szymon Bogumił Zug, who followed an influence of radical French classicism. A palladian by influence was also Piotr Aigner - author of the facade of St. Anne's Church in Warsaw (1786-1788) and St. Alexander Church (1818-1826). Palladian ideas were implemented in a popular type of a palace with a pillared portico.

The most famous buildings of the Stanislavian period include the Royal Castle in Warsaw, rebuilt by Dominik Merlini and Jan Christian Kamsetzer, Palace on the Water, Królikarnia and the palace in Jabłonna. Kamsetzer erected the Amphitheatre in the Royal Baths Park and the Warsaw palaces of the Raczyńskis and Tyszkiewiczs as well as the palace in Iskierniki. Among the most notable works by Szymon Bogumił Zug is a palace in Natolin and Holy Trinity Church and gardens: Solec, Powązki, Mokotów and Arcadia near Nieborów.

From the period of the Congress Kingdom are Koniecpolski Palace and the St. Alexander's Church in Warsaw, the Temple of the Sibyl in Puławy, rebuilding the Łańcut Castle. The leading figure in the Congress Kingdom was Antoni Corrazzi. Corazzi has created a complex of Bank Square in Warsaw, the edifices of the Treasury, Revenue and the Commission of Government, the building of the Staszic Palace, Mostowski Palace and designed the Grand Theatre. Belvedere and Pawłowice were created by Jakub Kubicki, while Lubostroń and Dobrzyca by Stanisław Zawadzki. The notable town halls in Łowicz, Płock, Błonie, Konin and Aleksandrów Łódzki are dating back the first half of the nineteenth century.

Stanislavian classicism gallery

Congress Kingdom classicism gallery

References

External links 
 

 
Poland
N
N
Neoclassical